Major-General Hugh Francis Edward MacMahon, CB, CSI, CBE, MC (13 October 1880 – 18 February 1939) was a senior British Indian Army officer.

Biography

Born in 1880, MacMahon was educated at Bedford School and at the Royal Military College, Sandhurst. He received his first commission as a second lieutenant in the Indian Staff Corps on 20 January 1900 and served with the 27th Punjabis in Waziristan between 1901 and 1902. He was promoted to lieutenant on 20 April 1902. During the First World War he served in France and Mesopotamia. He served in Kurdistan, in 1919, in Waziristan, between 1923 and 1924, and on the North West Frontier, between 1927 and 1928. He was appointed Aide-de-camp to King George V in 1929, promoted to the rank of major general in 1930, and was deputy adjutant and quartermaster general, Northern Command, between 1933 and 1937.

Major General Hugh MacMahon became a Commander of the Order of the British Empire in 1925, a Companion of the Order of the Bath in 1931, and a Companion of the Order of the Star of India in 1937. He retired from the British Indian Army in 1937 and died in London on 18 February 1939.

References

1880 births
1939 deaths
People educated at Bedford School
Graduates of the Royal Military College, Sandhurst
British Indian Army generals
Recipients of the Military Cross
Companions of the Order of the Bath
Companions of the Order of the Star of India
Commanders of the Order of the British Empire
Indian Army personnel of World War I
Indian Staff Corps officers